Feeling Yes, Feeling No is a film series produced and distributed by the National Film Board of Canada to teach children between the ages of six and twelve to avoid being sexually assaulted by people they trust, family members, and strangers. The films consist of recordings of a play that began development in 1980 in Vancouver, British Columbia, by Green Thumb Theatre. Dennis Foon, Wendy Van Reisen, and Fran Gebhard finished writing the play in 1982. Initially performed in workshops with children, the play was very successful. The filmed version of the play consists of four films directed by Moira Simpson and released in 1984 along with accompanying printed matter intended to be used together as a sexual assault prevention program. The program is six hours long and explains the difference between good and bad physical intimacy. The series uses the terms 'yes' feelings and 'no' feelings and focuses on role-playing. The program was first implemented in primary schools in British Columbia and later spread to other Canadian provinces. In a 1991 study, 286 children in grades three and four went through the program and another 113 children were used as a control group. The study found that the children who went through the program had greater knowledge about sexual assault than the control children, and that the children who went through the program were slightly better than the control children at distinguishing between safe and unsafe situations.

References

Bibliography

External links

1984 direct-to-video films
National Film Board of Canada series
1982 plays
Social guidance films
Canadian short documentary films
1984 short films
Anti-pedophile activism
Films about pedophilia
Films about child sexual abuse
Sex education
Sexuality in Canada
Short film series
Direct-to-video film series
Canadian plays
Sexuality in plays
Films based on Canadian plays
French-language Canadian films
1980s English-language films
1980s Canadian films